Fixed verse forms are a kind of template or formula that poetry can be composed in. The opposite of fixed verse is free verse poetry, which by design has little or no pre-established guidelines.

The various poetic forms, such as meter, rhyme scheme, and stanzas guide and limit a poet's choices when composing poetry. A fixed verse form combines one or more of these limitations into a larger form.

A form usually demands strict adherence to the established guidelines that to some poets may seem stifling, while other poets view the  rigid structure as a challenge to be innovative and creative while staying within the guidelines.

Examples of fixed verse forms 

 Haiku  A Japanese form designed to be small and concise by limiting the number of lines and the number of syllables in a line. Japanese haiku are three-line poems with the first and the third line having five syllables and the middle having seven syllables. English-language Haiku may be shorter than seventeen syllables, though some poets prefer to keep to the 5-7-5 format.
Whitecaps on the bay:
A broken signboard banging
In the April wind.
—Richard Wright (collected in Haiku: This Other World, Arcade Publishing, 1998)

 Limerick  The limerick is an English form, usually humorous and often obscene.  It consists of five lines with an AABBA rhyme scheme, the third and fourth lines shorter than the other three.
There was an Old Man with a beard,
Who said, 'It is just as I feared!
Two Owls and a Hen,
Four Larks and a Wren,
Have all built their nests in my beard!'

—Edward Lear

 Sonnet  The sonnet is a European form and at its most basic requires that the total length be fourteen lines. There are two primary forms of the sonnet:
 English Sonnet
 In addition to above requirements, the English Sonnet must be four stanzas, the first three being quatrains and the last a couplet. Also the rhyme scheme for the quatrains is A-B-A-B and the final couplet is rhyming.
Let me not to the marriage of true minds
Admit impediments, love is not love
Which alters when it alteration finds,
Or bends with the remover to remove.

O no, it is an ever fixed mark
That looks on tempests and is never shaken;
It is the star to every wand'ring bark,
Whose worth's unknown although his height be taken.

Love's not time's fool, though rosy lips and cheeks
Within his bending sickle's compass come,
Love alters not with his brief hours and weeks,
But bears it out even to the edge of doom:

If this be error and upon me proved,
I never writ, nor no man ever loved.

—William Shakespeare, Sonnet 116

 Italian Sonnet  The Italian sonnet requires that the fourteen lines be broken into one octave (two quatrains), which describe a problem, followed by a sestet (two tercets), which gives the resolution to it.
Methought I saw my late espoused Saint
Brought to me like Alcestis from the grave,
Whom Joves great Son to her glad Husband gave,
Rescu'd from death by force though pale and faint.
Mine as whom washt from spot of child-bed taint,
Purification in the old Law did save,
And such, as yet once more I trust to have
Full sight of her in Heaven without restraint,

Came vested all in white, pure as her mind:
Her face was vail'd, yet to my fancied sight,
Love, sweetness, goodness, in her person shin'd
So clear, as in no face with more delight.
But O as to embrace me she enclin'd
I wak'd, she fled, and day brought back my night.

—John Milton, Sonnet XXIII

 Sestina  The sestina has a highly structured form consisting of six stanzas of six lines each, followed by a tercet (called its envoi or tornada) for a total of thirty-nine lines. The same set of six words ends the lines of each of the six-line stanzas, but in a different order each time.

September rain falls on the house.
In the failing light, the old grandmother
sits in the kitchen with the child
beside the Little Marvel Stove,
reading the jokes from the almanac,
laughing and talking to hide her tears.

She thinks that her equinoctial tears
and the rain that beats on the roof of the house
were both foretold by the almanac,
but only known to a grandmother.
The iron kettle sings on the stove.
She cuts some bread and says to the child,

It's time for tea now; but the child
is watching the teakettle's small hard tears
dance like mad on the hot black stove,
the way the rain must dance on the house.
Tidying up, the old grandmother
hangs up the clever almanac

on its string. Birdlike, the almanac
hovers half open above the child,
hovers above the old grandmother
and her teacup full of dark brown tears.
She shivers and says she thinks the house
feels chilly, and puts more wood in the stove.

It was to be, says the Marvel Stove.
I know what I know, says the almanac.
With crayons the child draws a rigid house 
and a winding pathway. Then the child 
puts in a man with buttons like tears 
and shows it proudly to the grandmother.

But secretly, while the grandmother
busies herself about the stove,
the little moons fall down like tears
from between the pages of the almanac
into the flower bed the child
has carefully placed in the front of the house.

Time to plant tears, says the almanac.
The grandmother sings to the marvelous stove
and the child draws another inscrutable house.

—Elizabeth Bishop

 Villanelle  A villanelle has only two rhyme sounds. The first and third lines of the first stanza are rhyming refrains that alternate as the third line in each successive stanza and form a couplet at the close. A villanelle is nineteen lines long, consisting of five tercets and one concluding quatrain.

Do not go gentle into that good night,
Old age should burn and rave at close of day;
Rage, rage against the dying of the light.

Though wise men at their end know dark is right,
Because their words had forked no lightning they
Do not go gentle into that good night.

Good men, the last wave by, crying how bright
Their frail deeds might have danced in a green bay,
Rage, rage against the dying of the light.

Wild men who caught and sang the sun in flight,
And learn, too late, they grieved it on its way,
Do not go gentle into that good night.

Grave men, near death, who see with blinding sight
Blind eyes could blaze like meteors and be gay, 
Rage, rage against the dying of the light.

And you, my father, there on the sad height,
Curse, bless, me now with your fierce tears, I pray.
Do not go gentle into that good night.
Rage, rage against the dying of the light.

—Dylan Thomas, Do not Go Gentle into That Good Night

Poetic forms
Literature lists